12951/12952 Mumbai Central - New Delhi - Mumbai Central Tejas Rajdhani is a semi-high-speed Fully AC Train belonging to Indian Railways that runs between  (MMCT) and  (NDLS) in India. It is the fastest Rajdhani service in all of India, with a maximum permissible speed of 140 km/h, although its all coaches are of air conditioned Tejas type which is capable of reaching 160 km/h. It is widely regarded as one of the most premium trains on the Indian Railway network and is given the highest priority in terms of clearance.

History
It was introduced on 17 May 1972 between the then Bombay Central (MMCT) and New Delhi. The train became so popular that prior to the introduction of current reservation facility its reservation chart was prepared just 15 minutes before the scheduled departure of the train. It is a daily service. It is hauled by Ghaziabad-based WAP7 end to end.

On 19 July 2021, the train made its first commercial run with its new Tejas class smart upgraded LHB coach, replacing the traditional LHB Rajdhani coaches.

Route & halts

Traction
It is hauled by a Vadodara Loco Shed based WAP-7 locomotive from end to end.

Speed
The maximum permissible speed of the train is up to 130 kmph except some parts. Its coaches are all Tejas class which are capable of reaching 160 kmph.
	
The maximum permissible speed of the train or the route is 120 kmph between New Delhi (NDLS) and Tuglakabad (TKD) but RDSO has been requested to corroborate the track quality fit for raising sectional speed to 130 kmph. The maximum permissible speed of the train is 140 kmph in Tuglakabad (TKD) –  Palwal (PWL) – Mathura (MTJ) route where it is slower than the fastest train of the route having speed of 160 kmph. The maximum permissible speed of the train or the route: 130 kmph in Mathura  (MTJ) – Nagda (NAD) – Ratlam (RTM) route, 100 kmph between Ratlam (RTM) and LIMKHEDA but Railway is trying to raise up to 110 kmph in its part between Limkheda and Megnagar and 130 kmph not feasible on Ghat (Hill) section. The maximum permissible speed of the train or the route: 110 kmph between LIMKHEDA and GODHRA (130 kmph not feasible on Ghat section), 130 kmph between GODHRA and VIRAR, 110 kmph in only 26 km long VIRAR – BORIVALI route, 100 kmph in only 30 km long BORIVALI – Mumbai Central (MMCT, formerly BCT) route. 
	
Railway Board has approved the speed policy which envisages operation of passenger trains at 160 kmph on Delhi–Mumbai route but it is still unclear what will its impact on this train in future like increasing of speed but not up to 160 kmph or up to 160 kmph.

Incidents
On 18 April 2011, three coaches of the train caught fire, including the pantry car. There were no casualties among the 900 passengers.

Further reading

References

External links

Delhi–Mumbai trains
Railway services introduced in 1972
Rajdhani Express trains
Rail transport in Madhya Pradesh
Rail transport in Gujarat
Rail transport in Rajasthan
Rail transport in Haryana
Rail transport in Delhi
Rail transport in Maharashtra